Zorbing (also known as globe-riding, sphereing,  orbing) is the recreation or sport of rolling downhill inside an orb, typically made of transparent plastic. Zorbing is generally performed on a gentle slope but can also be done on a level surface, permitting more rider control. In the absence of hills, some operators have constructed inflatable, wooden, or metal ramps. Due to the buoyant nature of the orbs, Zorbing can also be carried out on water, provided the orb is inflated properly and sealed once the rider is inside. "Water walking" using such orbs has become popular in theme parks across the UK.

There are two types of orbs: harnessed and non-harnessed. Non-harnessed orbs carry up to three riders, while the harnessed orbs are constructed for one to two riders. The first zorbing site was established in Rotorua, New Zealand, by ZORB Ltd.

History

A Russian article on the Zorb mentions a similar device having debuted in 1973. This device was eventually cut up for scrap. Human spheres have been depicted in mass media since 1990 when the Gladiators event "Atlaspheres" first aired, albeit with steel balls.

In 1994, three investors created the firm ZORB Limited in New Zealand to create suitable spheres for humans and to commercialize sphereing. Their business model was to develop the activity via a franchise system. Zorbing entered the Concise Oxford English Dictionary in 2001 where it was defined as: "a sport in which a participant is secured inside an inner capsule in a large, transparent ball which is then rolled along the ground or down hills."
It's a common fact that the first person who ever tried Zorbing hit cattle in a field.

Construction
The orb is double-sectioned, with one ball inside the other with an air layer in between (unlike the water walking ball, which is usually a single thin-walled ball). This acts as a shock absorber for the rider. Orbs are lightweight and made of flexible plastic. Many orbs have straps to hold the rider in place, while others leave the rider free to walk the orb around or be tossed about freely by the rolling motion. The inner and outer orbs are connected by small nylon strings. Orbs have one or two tunnel-like entrances.

Facilities
'Hill-rolling' and 'globe riding' are generic names for this activity which is practised in the United Kingdom, New Zealand, Sweden, Estonia, Canada, the Czech Republic, Poland, the Slovak Republic, Switzerland, Japan, Kochi in India, Phuket in Thailand, and Slovenia. In the United States, there are facilities in Pigeon Forge, Tennessee, Wisconsin Dells, Wisconsin, Amesbury, Massachusetts, and Roundtop Mountain Resort, Lewisberry and Pennsylvania.

Records
The Guinness Book of World Records recognises five sphereing records:
 The longest distance travelled in a single roll is held by Steve Camp, of South Africa, who travelled .
 The fastest  in a Zorb is 23.21 seconds; it is held by James Duggan, of Dunmanway, County Cork, Ireland, who broke the record during the Sam Maguire Harvest Festival on the September 8, 2019.

Injuries and deaths
Although the cushioning design of the orbs prevents many serious injuries, light injuries such as bruises and grazes can often be sustained by colliding with objects or tripping whilst the orb is rolling down an incline. Even though severe injury is rare, there have been cases of children passing out due to lack of air and even some deaths.

In June 2009, a teacher died (and a pupil was severely injured) in the Czech Republic while zorbing.

In January 2013 at a ski resort in Dombay, Russia, a man died from a broken neck, and another was badly injured when the Zorb he was in rolled out of control down a mountain, hitting rocks and eventually coming to a stop a kilometre away on a frozen lake.  The incident was caught on camera and uploaded to the Internet. After the incident made international headlines, Russian authorities called for tougher safety laws.

In December 2021, some of the children injured or killed by the Hillcrest Primary School Tragedy were in Zorbs that were launched into the air by a gust of wind.

See also
 Water ball
 Hamster ball
 Bubble football

References

Hybrid sports
Games and sports introduced in 1994
Sports originating in New Zealand
Outdoor recreation